Alyosha Monument may refer to:
Alyosha Monument, Murmansk, Russia
Alyosha Monument, Plovdiv, Bulgaria
Bronze Soldier of Tallinn, Estonia

See also
"Alyosha" (song), a song inspired by the Plovdiv monument